This is a summary of the electoral history of Jim McLay, Leader of the National Party (1984–86), and Member of Parliament for  (1975–87).

Parliamentary elections

1975 election

1978 election

1981 election

1984 election

Leadership elections

1984 deputy leadership election

1984 leadership election

1986 leadership election

Notes

References

McLay, Jim